Argyresthia pulchella is a moth of the family Yponomeutidae. It is found in Fennoscandia, the Netherlands, France, Germany, Switzerland, Austria, Italy, Poland, the Czech Republic, Slovakia, Romania, Latvia, Estonia and Russia.

The wingspan is 10–13 mm. The forewings are dark brown to brownish black. Adults are on wing from the beginning of June to August.

The larvae feed on Sorbus aucuparia and sometimes Malus and Corylus avellana. They feed on the fruit of their host plant.

References

Moths described in 1846
Argyresthia
Moths of Europe